Michael Joseph Estabrook  (born July 28, 1976) is an American Major League Baseball umpire. He made his first umpiring appearance at the Major League level on May 7, 2006. Estabrook wears uniform number 83. It was announced on January 14, 2014, that Estabrook was added to the full-time MLB Umpire staff.

Umpiring career 
In , Estabrook ejected Kansas City Royals manager Ned Yost from a game after Estabrook had confronted Royals catcher Jason Kendall. Later, Yost was quoted as saying, "I'll never let an umpire show up one of my players, and that's exactly what he was doing." Kendall stated, "He got in my face, and it was unprofessional what he did."

Estabrook was officially hired to the full-time MLB staff prior to the 2014 season.

Estabrook worked his first career MLB Playoff game in left field on October 7, 2015, between the Chicago Cubs and the Pittsburgh Pirates.

See also 

 List of Major League Baseball umpires

References

External links 
Retrosheet
Close Call Sports

1976 births
Living people
Major League Baseball umpires
Sportspeople from Daytona Beach, Florida